The Balochistan forest dormouse (Dryomys niethammeri) is a species of rodent in the family Gliridae. It is native to Pakistan.

Habitat
The Balochistan forest dormouse is found in juniper forest of Ziarat, however deforestation has caused decrease in their population.

References

Holden, M. E.. 2005. Family Gliridae. pp. 819–841 in Mammal Species of the World a Taxonomic and Geographic Reference. D. E. Wilson and D. M. Reeder eds. Johns Hopkins University Press, Baltimore.

Mammals of Pakistan
Dryomys
Mammals described in 1996
Endemic fauna of Pakistan
Taxonomy articles created by Polbot